Mervyn Leslie Lawrence Bolger (14 June 1919 – 16 September 1993) was an Australian rules footballer who played with North Melbourne in the Victorian Football League (VFL).

Bulger later served in the Royal Australian Air Force during World War II.

Notes

External links 

1919 births
Australian rules footballers from Victoria (Australia)
North Melbourne Football Club players
1993 deaths